Metal Storm is an action-platform video game developed by Tamtex and published by Irem for the Nintendo Entertainment System.

The story takes place in 2501, when a laser weapon at a defense outpost on Pluto has malfunctioned and begun destroying the Solar System. The player takes on the role of the M-308 Gunner, which storms into the defense base in order to activate the self-destruct system before the laser gun destroys Earth. The M-308 is equipped with a gravity control device which allows the player to flip between the floor and ceiling, a main feature of the game. Metal Storm received positive reviews from gaming publications.

Gameplay

Metal Storm is an action-platform game featuring six stages with two acts each, and a final boss rush stage.

The player takes on the role of the M-308 Gunner, an all-purpose combat robot with a specially equipped gravity control device. By hitting "Up" and "jump" buttons at the same time, the player can flip from the floor to the ceiling and vice versa. Other games feature a "reverse gravity" gameplay, such as Mega Man 5, and Strider, but Metal Storm is one of the few games to be built entirely around this concept.

The player is also equipped with a gun to destroy enemies. The player can pick up various power-ups including a power booster for the gun, a shield, and a fireball ability for when flipping gravity. When a stage is finished, a password is provided which saves the score, special weapons, and number of lives left.

Plot
In the year 2501, mankind has colonized the Solar System, but all is not well. On a defense outpost on Pluto, a robot-controlled laser gun built to protect Earth from alien invaders has begun to malfunction. It has turned against the human race, and begun destroying the Solar System. Most recently, the people of Earth watched helplessly as Neptune was destroyed. Attempts to activate the station's self-destruct system have failed. In a last ditch effort, the player must storm the Pluto base with the most sophisticated weaponry available, the M-308 Gunner, and enable the self-destruct device.  After the final boss is destroyed, the leaders of Earth grant the M-308 Gunner immortality, with the duty to protect mankind from future threats.

Release 
It was released in North America in February 1991, and in Japan on April 24, 1992. Nintendo Power provided substantial coverage of Metal Storm. When the game was released, one of their issues featured the game on its cover and a 12-page strategy guide. In 2019, Retro-Bit released a collector's edition of Metal Storm that included reproduction NES cartridge, game box, full-color instruction manual, certificate of authenticity, M-308 Gunner figurine, M-308 Gunner pin, art prints, and poster.

Reception

Famitsu gave the game a score of 24 out of 40. Nintendo Power included Metal Storm among a series of games they dubbed "Unsung Heroes of the NES." They complimented the game's inventive play control, boss design, and level of challenge. They blamed low distribution for its lack in popularity, and referenced themselves as the best marketing support the game ever received.

IGN ranked Metal Storm as #46 on their top 100 NES games list. They called the game a "tour de force" from a technical perspective, pushing the NES to its technical limits by using simulated parallax scrolling and advanced animation techniques. 1up.com listed the game on their list of "Hidden Gems" for the NES, and praised the "reverse gravity" gimmick, which they say adds challenge and makes the game unique. They also stated the game is quite difficult and rather short.

Notes

References

External links

 Metal Storm at MobyGames

1991 video games
Action video games
Irem games
Nintendo Entertainment System games
Nintendo Entertainment System-only games
Platform games
Single-player video games
Video games about mecha
Video games developed in Japan
Video games set in the 24th century